The 2021 Antalya Challenger IV was a professional tennis tournament played on clay courts. It was the fourth edition of the tournament which was part of the 2021 ATP Challenger Tour. It took place in Antalya, Turkey between 6 and 12 December 2021.

Singles main-draw entrants

Seeds

1 Rankings as of 29 November 2021.

Other entrants
The following players received wildcards into the singles main draw:
  Sarp Ağabigün
  Cem İlkel
  Alexandru Jecan

The following players received entry from the qualifying draw:
  Andrey Chepelev
  Cezar Crețu
  Marsel İlhan
  Damien Wenger

The following players received entry as lucky losers:
  Grigoriy Lomakin
  Jakub Paul
  Oleg Prihodko

Champions

Singles

 Evgenii Tiurnev def.  Oleg Prihodko 3–6, 6–4, 6–4.

Doubles

 Hsu Yu-hsiou /  Oleksii Krutykh def.  Sanjar Fayziev /  Markos Kalovelonis 6–1, 7–6(7–5).

References

2021 ATP Challenger Tour
2021 in Turkish tennis
December 2021 sports events in Asia